The 2018–19 Slovenian Second League season was the 28th edition of the Slovenian Second League. The season began on 4 August 2018 and ended on 26 May 2019.

Competition format
Each team played a total of 30 matches (15 home and 15 away). Teams played two matches against each other (1 home and 1 away).

Teams

The key for the 16 teams contesting the league was:
1 relegated team from the 2017–18 Slovenian PrvaLiga
13 teams ranked second to fourteenth in the 2017–18 Slovenian Second League season
2 promoted teams from the 2017–18 Slovenian Third League.

Stadiums and locations

Note: "Capacity" includes seating capacity only. Most stadiums also have standing areas.

Personnel
As of May 2019

League table

Standings

Results

Season statistics

Top goalscorers

Source: NZS

Attendances

 
Note 1:Team played the previous season in the Slovenian PrvaLiga.  Note 2:Team played the previous season in the Slovenian Third League.

See also
2018–19 Slovenian Football Cup
2018–19 Slovenian PrvaLiga
2018–19 Slovenian Third League

References

External links
Official website 

Slovenian Second League seasons
2
Slovenia